Collins View is a neighborhood in the Southwest section of Portland, Oregon. It borders the neighborhoods of Marshall Park and Arnold Creek to the west, Tryon Creek State Natural Area to the south, Dunthorpe (in unincorporated Multnomah County), River View Cemetery and River View Natural Area to the east, and the South Burlingame neighborhood to the north. The campus of Lewis & Clark College is located the southeastern portion of the neighborhood.

References

External links
 Guide to Collins View Neighborhood (PortlandNeighborhood.com)
 Rainfall at Collins View (Riverdale High School) Raingage (water.USGS.gov)
 Collins View Neighborhood Association
 Collins View - The Place
 New Collins View Blog

Neighborhoods in Portland, Oregon